Ghaznavi may refer to: 

Ghaznavi (surname), a surname
Ghaznavids, a Muslim (Turkic) dynasty 
Ghaznavi, Iran, village in Iran
Ghaznavi (missile), a Pakistani missile
Ghaznavi Force, an auxiliary Special Operations unit formed by the Pakistan Army

See also 
 Ghazni (disambiguation)